The Six Heretical Teachers, Six Heretics, Six Śramaṇa, or Six Tirthikas (false teachers) were six sectarian contemporaries of Gautama Buddha (Śākyamuni), each of whom held a view in opposition to his teachings. Except for Nigantha Nataputta or Mahavira, the twenty-fourth Tirthankara Of Jainism, the other five heretical teachers were regarded as the holders of some or other form of Akiriyavada views.

In Buddhist tradition, they were defeated by Buddha in the miracle contest known as the Twin Miracle.

The six heretics and their views on Indian philosophy are described in detail in the Samaññaphala Sutta of the Digha Nikaya in the Pali Tipitaka.

Background 

According to the sutra, King Ajātasattu visited Gautama Buddha, who, at the time, was living in the mango grove of Jīvaka in Rajagaha among 1250 bhikkhus. The king posed the Buddha the question of whether or not it was possible that the life of a śramaṇa could bear fruit in the same way as the lives of craftsmen bear fruit, declaring that he had previously asked six teachers (Pūraṇa Kassapa, Makkhali Gosāla, Ajita Kesakambala, Pakudha Kaccāyana, Nigaṇṭha Nāṭaputta and Sañjaya Belaṭṭhaputta) the same question, yet had not found a satisfactory answer. At the Buddha's request, King Ajātasattu describes, the answers given to him by the six other teachers.

The names below are provided in Sanskrit, with the equivalent Pali names given in parentheses.

Pūrṇa Kāśyapa (Pūraṇa Kassapa) 
The first spiritual teacher to whom Ajātasattu posed his question was Pūraṇa Kassapa. Kassapa posited the theory of akiriyāvāda (non-doing):  actions considered good and evil carried no inherent morality and thus there exists no future consequence from committing either "good" or "evil" deeds.

Maskarī Gośālīputra (Makkhali Gosāla) 
Makkhali Gosala, the second teacher visited by Ajātasattu, subscribed to the doctrine of non-causality; the attainment of any condition is dependent on circumstance, fate, or nature rather than human will and events lack in root cause. Like Kassapa, Gosāla denied the existence of karma and vipaka. This doctrine has been likened to fatalism and determinism. His theory is also called the theory of causelessness (ahetukavAda), the theory of natural purity (saMsArasuddhivAda).

Ajita Keśakambala (Ajita Kesakambala) 
Ajita Kesakambala followed Gosāla as the third teacher mentioned by Ajātasattu. He is thought to be a materialist (BhautikavAdi), nihilist (ücchedavAdi) and an exponent of non-efficacy of kamma (åkiriyavAdi). Kesakambala held that all in existence was merely the process of natural phenomena and vehemently denied the existence of any life after death; "A man is built up of the four elements', when he dies, earth returns to the aggregate of earth, water to water, fire to fire, air to air, and the senses vanish into space."

Kakuda Kātyāyana (Pakudha Kaccāyana) 
Pakudha Kaccāyana, the fourth teacher referred to by Ajātasattu, was an atomist who posited that all things were made up of earth, fire, air, water, pleasure, pain, and the soul, which were unchangeable and eternal. Thus objects, like living beings, composed of the elements are subject to change, while the elements themselves are absolutely fixed in their existences. Thus by this dualism view, actions are defined solely by the physical interaction between these substances, rather than the moral value ascribed to them.

Nirgrantha Jñatiputra (Nigaṇṭha Nāṭaputta) 
Nigaṇṭha Nāṭaputta, a Jain monk Mahavira, was the fifth teacher who Ajātasattu questioned. Nāṭaputta answered Ajātasattu with a description of Jain teachings, which, unlike the previous teachers recognized morality and consequences in the afterlife. The philosophy of Nāṭaputta, however, varied from that of Buddha in its belief that involuntary actions, like voluntary actions, carry karmic weight; Buddhism holds that only actions with intention have the potential to generate karma.

Saṃjaya Vairāṣṭrikaputra (Sañjaya Belaṭṭhaputta) 
Sañjaya Belaṭṭhaputta was the sixth and final teacher referenced by Ajātasattu . He is said to have replied to King Ajātasattu as follows:

If you ask me whether there is another world, and if I thought there were, I would tell you so. But I do not say so. I do not say that it is thus or thus; I do not say that it is otherwise; I do not say that I deny it; I do not say that I do not deny it; I do not say that there is, there is not, is and is not, neither is nor is not, another world. If you ask me whether there are beings of spontaneous birth...whether there is any fruit, any result, of good or bad actions...whether a man who has won the truth continues to be after death... (The same answer is repeated after each of these problems as in the answer of the first question)

Belaṭṭhaputta did not provide Ajātasattu with a clear answer to his question one way or another, leading some scholars to align him with Ajñana, an agnostic school of Indian philosophy which held that metaphysical knowledge was impossible to obtain.

See also 
 Tirthika

References 

Early Buddhism
Indian philosophy
Heresy in Buddhism